Manoj Vijay Joglekar (born 1 November 1973), is an Indian cricketer. He is a left-handed batsman and a right-arm offbreak bowler. An opener, he faced competition in his early days from more famous Mumbai prodigies - Vinod Kambli and Sachin Tendulkar. Joglekar was made the captain of the U-19 team that hosted England in 1992/93 season. The series was drawn 1-1 though Joglekar played in the middle-order and did not have much success.

Manoj Joglekar made his debut in Ranji Trophy domestic cricket in the same season (1992/93) and was constantly fighting for a place in the squad. He never received an opportunity to play International Cricket and left the Mumbai after the 2005/06 season, although he made several appearances for the Goa cricket team in 2007/08.

External links
 

1973 births
Living people
Cricketers from Mumbai
Indian cricketers
Mumbai cricketers
Goa cricketers
West Zone cricketers
Assam cricketers
Jharkhand cricketers